Håvard Nygaard (born August 27, 1994) better known as rain, is a Norwegian professional Counter-Strike: Global Offensive player for FaZe Clan. He is the longest lasting member of the lineup, having played since the team first formed under the Team Kinguin banner.

Career

After entering the pro scene following several stints in the semi-professional level, Rain moved between several Norwegian teams, from party astronauts to LGB. Whilst these teams gained little success internationally, they were consistently the best team nationally and rain was consistently the best player on these teams.

In May 2015 he was then poached by Team Kinguin who were one of the first organizations to experiment with international rosters. This team peaked with a quarter-final placement at the major tournament ESL One Cologne 2015 where there went out with a loss to TSM. Following this promising showing the roster was picked up by G2 eSports, due in part to Kinguin's withdrawal from eSports. The team again made quarterfinals at a major, this time DreamHack Open Cluj-Napoca 2015, losing to eventual winners EnVyUs.

The roster was again bought, this time by FaZe Clan for a record-breaking $700,000, but by this point, many of the players from the original international Kinguin lineup had been replaced, with only the core trio remaining. Under the FaZe banner, this trend continued with eventually all of the roster being replaced bar rain, with the roster first gaining success with victory at Starseries' Sl i-league season 3 in April 2017. Though whilst rain performed admirably, the roster failed to repeat success, leading to more team changes until the team eventually ended up with what many considered the most talent dense team to date. Whilst this team had early success, with two back to back flawless victories at the Eleague CS:GO Premier 2017 and ESL One New York 2017, the team did not manage to find consistency and was largely considered relatively dysfunctional following a 2nd-place finish at the 2018 Boston Eleague Major.

Whilst rain's performance got him several accolades in 2017 and 2018, since then his personal level had declined with that of his team, and both his and his team's performance was hit or miss as the team tried out several different players in an attempt to complete the roster. This process is still ongoing come November 2019, where the most recent additions have revitalized the team somewhat despite rain's personal level being somewhat below average since May.

Rain won his first major championship at the PGL Major Antwerp 2022 with FaZe Clan, and was named the tournament's MVP.

Awards and recognition

 Voted the 4th best player of 2017, 18th best player of 2018, and 13th best player of 2022 by HLTV.org.
 Voted the MVP of 3 different tournaments, including the PGL Major Antwerp 2022.

References

External links
Facebook
Instagram
Twitter
 

1994 births
Living people
Counter-Strike players
FaZe Clan players
Twitch (service) streamers
People from Stavanger